USS Lake (DE-301) was an  of the United States Navy during World War II. She was sent off into the Pacific Ocean to protect convoys and other ships from Japanese submarines and fighter aircraft. She performed escort and antisubmarine operations in dangerous battle areas and returned home with two battle stars.

Namesake
John Ervin Lake was born on 22 October 1910 in Chicago, Illinois. He enlisted in the Navy on 13 April 1928. After service on several ships and stations ashore, Lake was warranted Acting Pay Clerk 16 September 1940 and assigned to the cruiser .

Construction and commissioning
Lake was laid down on 22 April 1943 by Mare Island Navy Yard, Vallejo, California; launched on 18 August 1943; sponsored by Mrs. Carol M. Feldman; and commissioned on 5 February 1944.

World War II Pacific Theater operations 
Lake sailed from San Francisco, California, on 11 April 1944 escorting to a convoy to Hawaii and arriving on 20 April. She operated there until sailing on 23 June to escort a convoy to the Marshall Islands. Lake sortied on 5 July from Eniwetok with a hunter-killer group for anti-submarine patrols off the Marianas protecting vital shipping lanes during the conquest of Saipan and the liberation of Guam.

Rescuing Japanese floating on a raft 
Lake headed toward the Marshalls shepherding two merchantmen. En route she picked up from a small raft two Japanese from nearby Wotje Island. On arriving Kwajalein on 2 September, she turned the prisoners over to the Army and sailed escorting transports carrying troops to the Palaus for the invasion of Peleliu. Reaching the Palaus on 21 September, she served on escort duty in the area for the next few weeks.

Philippine operations 
In November, Lake screened the fueling group which serviced units of the fast carrier task force during the invasion of the Philippines. She remained with the group off Leyte until she headed for the Bonins 15 February for the invasion of Iwo Jima.

Okinawa operations 
After Iwo Jima had been secured, Lake screened the task group that supplied Task Force 58 during operations against Okinawa. Throughout the campaign, she made shuttle runs to Ulithi, escorting empty oilers. On 8 August, she was ordered to escort and give anti-submarine protection to 12 oilers and one merchantman heading for a rendezvous close off Japan.

End-of-War decommissioning 
After the Japanese surrender, Lake returned to the west coast, arriving San Francisco on 13 October. She decommissioned at Mare Island, California, on 3 December and was sold on 14 December 1946 to Puget Sound Navigation Co., Seattle, Washington, for scrapping.

Awards  
Lake received two battle stars for World War II service.

References

External links

 

Evarts-class destroyer escorts
Ships built in Vallejo, California
1943 ships
World War II frigates and destroyer escorts of the United States